Fruit Pie the Magician was the official mascot for Hostess fruit pies for over three decades, from 1973 until early 2006. Fruit Pie the Magician was featured in print ads in comic books as well as animated in television commercials. The character appeared on Hostess product labels as an anthropomorphic fruit pie sporting a cape, white gloves, top hat, and magic wand.

Hostess described the mascot: "Fruit Pie the Magician loves to entertain friends with his wacky magic tricks. His favorite magic trick is to make Hostess Fruit Pies appear out of thin air. You always have to keep an eye on the Magician or else he may play a trick on you."

Fruit Pie was parodied in The Order of the Stick webcomic episode 91.

See also
Captain Cupcake
Twinkie the Kid

External links
Meet the Hostess Gang
Do You Remember Fruit Pie the Magician and Twinkie the Kid?

Cartoon mascots
Food advertising characters
Male characters in advertising
Fictional food characters
Fictional stage magicians
Hostess Brands
Mascots introduced in 1973